The 2001 Georgia Bulldogs football team represented the University of Georgia in the 2001 NCAA Division I-A football season. The Bulldogs completed the season with an 8–4 record.

Schedule

Game summaries

Vanderbilt

References

Georgia
Georgia Bulldogs football seasons
Georgia Bulldogs football